José B. Cuéllar is a professor of Chicano Studies at San Francisco State University. He is the band leader of the musical group Dr. Loco's Rockin' Jalapeño Band. Cuéllar holds a Ph.D. in Anthropology and is a scholar of Chicano culture.

External links
Autobiography from Cuellar's website
Article based on interview with Cuellar

Year of birth missing (living people)
Living people
San Francisco State University faculty
American academics of Mexican descent
Musicians from San Antonio
American male saxophonists
21st-century American saxophonists
21st-century American male musicians